Hrebenne is the name of two villages in Lublin Voivodeship, southeastern Poland:
Hrebenne, Hrubieszów County 
Hrebenne, Tomaszów Lubelski County